George McLeay (6 August 1892 – 14 September 1955) was an Australian politician and senior minister in the Menzies Liberal government.

Early life
McLeay was born in Port Clinton, South Australia and educated at Port Clinton Public School until 1906 when he was sent to Adelaide where he continued his education at Unley Public School. At the outbreak of World War I, he was rejected for service in the First Australian Imperial Force and did civilian war work instead. He and his younger brother Jack – who also became a federal politician, as did his son, John – set up as accountants and agents and eventually became wholesale and retail merchants. In October 1924, he married Marcia Doreen Weston.

Political career
At twenty McLeay joined the Liberal Union and in 1922 ran unsuccessfully for election for the seat of Adelaide in the House of Representatives. In the 1934 elections, he was elected to the Australian Senate. He was leader of the government in the Senate from November 1938 to October 1941 and Vice-President of the Executive Council from November 1938 to March 1940 and from October 1940 to October 1941. He was Minister for Commerce from April 1939 to March 1940 in the first Menzies Ministry and Minister for Trade and Customs from March to October 1940 in the second Menzies Ministry. He was Postmaster-General in the third Menzies Ministry from October 1940 until the fall of the government in August 1941 and Minister for Repatriation until June 1941 and Minister for Supply and Development from June to October 1941.

McLeay was leader of the opposition in the Senate from 1941 until the end of his Senate term in June 1947. He was defeated in the 1946 elections, but re-elected to the Senate in 1949 elections. Robert Menzies appointed him Minister for Shipping and Fuel in 1949; Minister for Shipping, Fuel and Transport in 1950; and Minister for Shipping and Transport in 1951. He energetically negotiated with shipowners and trade unions to improve the performance of the ports. In 1954, the Commonwealth Railways mounted his name on a diesel locomotive – NSU class no. 51.

McLeay suffered from diabetes mellitus and was affected by excessive travel. He died from ischaemic heart disease at Calvary Hospital, North Adelaide, survived by his wife, son and daughter.

Notes

1892 births
1955 deaths
United Australia Party members of the Parliament of Australia
Liberal Party of Australia members of the Parliament of Australia
Members of the Australian Senate for South Australia
Members of the Australian Senate
Deaths from diabetes
Members of the Cabinet of Australia
Politicians from Adelaide
People from Clinton, South Australia
George
20th-century Australian politicians